Lycon may refer to:
Lycon, a son of King Hippocoon of Sparta in Greek mythology
Lycon, a prosecutor in the trial of Socrates mentioned in Plato's dialogue, the Apology
Lyco of Iasos (4th century BC) Pythagorean philosopher
Lyco of Troas (3rd century BC) Peripatetic philosopher
Asyut, Egypt, a city whose Latin name was Lycon